"Short Fat Fannie" (alternatively "Short Fat Fanny") is Larry Williams' second single release after "High School Dance".    Williams' original penned track peaked at number five on the U.S. pop chart, and at number one on the R&B chart. It sold over one million records, Williams' first million seller.

Recording
The track was recorded on April 26, 1957. The musicians included:
 Robert "Bumps" Blackwell, leader
 Jesse James Jones, tenor sax
 Leon M. Silby, piano
 René Hall, guitar
 Ted Brinson, bass
 Earl Palmer, drums

Cover versions
The song was rehearsed by The Beatles during the filming of the documentary, Let It Be in 1969.  The song was recorded on the film soundtrack and is featured on many bootleg recordings.

"Short Fat Fannie" was an early example of a novelty genre including pop song titles. This formula was later used for Bobby Darin's "Splish Splash" and Bob Kayli's "Everyone Was There", as well as both of Billy and Lillie's hits, "La Dee Dah" and "Lucky Ladybug".

The song was also covered by Billy Preston, The Beatles, Little Richard, Frankie Lymon & The Teenagers, Curtis Johnson, Ronnie Self, The Dovells and Johnny Winter. Frankie Avalon also recorded the song.

The track was also a favorite of Levon Helm, drummer of The Band. He would sing the song often while touring as the Hawks, and even played a version of it on Late Night with Conan O'Brien in 1993.

Charts
 Billboard R&B: No. 1
 Billboard Hot 100: No. 5
 Billboard Hot 100 - B-side: No. 45
 UK Singles Chart: No. 21

References

1957 singles
Larry Williams songs
Songs written by Larry Williams